Partido Social Democrata or Partido Social Demócrata may refer to:

 Social Democratic Party (Bolivia)
 Social Democratic Party (East Timor)
 Social Democratic Party (El Salvador)
 Social Democratic Party (Nicaragua)
 Social Democratic Party (Portugal)
 Social Democratic Party (Spain)

See also
 Social Democratic Party

de:Social Democratic Party
ko:사회민주당
ja:社会民主党
pt:Partido Social Democrata
ru:СДП
simple:Social Democratic Party
sr:СДП
fi:Sosiaalidemokraattinen puolue